Fondazione Cassa di Risparmio di Reggio Emilia – Pietro Manodori  known as Fondazione Manodori, is a non-profit organization based in Palazzo del Monte, Reggio Emilia, Emilia-Romagna. The organization originated from the saving bank of the city (Cassa di Risparmio di Reggio Emilia) found by Pietro Manodori.

Foundation today
Upon the merger of Capitalia and UniCredit, the foundation was a minority shareholder of UniCredit for 0.90% as the 8th largest shareholder. It was decreased to 0.38% as at 31 December 2013 and 0.278% at 31 December 2015.

Foundations Art Collection
The Art Collection of the Foundation of Reggio Emilia Saving Bank – Pietro Manodori (Italian: Collezione d'arte della Fondazione Cassa di Risparmio di Reggio Emilia Pietro Manodori) is a small, but publicly exhibited collection of artists mainly from the Emilia-Romagna region, specially concentrating in works from the 17th century, the Baroque period when the local artist community, along with the Bolognese school of painters, had gained prominence. Collecting by this financial house began in earnest in the mid-1990s.

The collection was collected by Cassa di Risparmio di Reggio Emilia, which was absorbed into UniCredit. However, the art collection was owned by the former owner of the bank instead, the Fondazione Cassa di Risparmio di Reggio Emilia Pietro Manodori (Fondazione Manodori in short). The collection also includes more works collected by Elio Monducci; an endowment of works and studies by Marco Gerra (1925-2000) donated by his widow, Anna Maria Ternelli; and finally works by Alberto Manfredi.

Historic Collection (1500-1800)

Monducci Collections

References

External links
 Official Site 
 Official website for Art Collections

Capitalia Group
1991 establishments in Italy
Organizations established in 1991
Banking foundations based in Italy
Organisations based in Reggio Emilia
Art museums and galleries in Emilia-Romagna
Private art collections